Criscuolo is an Italian surname. Notable people with the surname include:

 Alessandro Criscuolo (1937–2020), Italian judge
 Giovanni Angelo Criscuolo (1500–1573), Italian painter
 Giovanni Filippo Criscuolo (c. 1500–1584), Italian painter
 Kyle Criscuolo (born 1992), American ice hockey player
 Mariangiola Criscuolo (c. 1548–1630), Italian painter
 Roberto Criscuolo (born 1997), Italian football player

Italian-language surnames